The Ukrainian Cup 2001–02 was the 11th annual edition of Ukraine's football knockout competition, known as the Ukrainian Cup. The winner of this competition was Shakhtar Donetsk.

Team allocation

Distribution

Round and draw dates
All draws held at FFU headquarters (Building of Football) in Kyiv unless stated otherwise.

Competition schedule

First preliminary round 

Notes:

Second preliminary round

Third preliminary round

First Qualification Round 

|}

Second Qualification Round 

|}

First round 

|}

Quarterfinals 

|}

Semifinals 

|}

Final

Ukrainian Cup seasons
Cup
Ukrainian Cup